George W. Gushue was a politician in Newfoundland. He represented Trinity in the Newfoundland House of Assembly from 1894 to 1897 and from 1900 to 1909.

He was elected to the Newfoundland assembly in an 1894 by-election but was defeated when he ran for reelection in 1897. Gushue was reelected in 1900, 1904 and 1908. From 1900 to 1907, he served as Minister of Public Works, but was not a member of the cabinet. He was defeated when he ran for reelection in 1909. After leaving politics, he was manager of the stationery department at the Reid Newfoundland Company.

Gushue's Bridge in Georgetown was named in his honour and some sources say that Georgetown was also named after him.

References

Members of the Newfoundland and Labrador House of Assembly
Year of birth missing
Year of death missing
Dominion of Newfoundland politicians
Newfoundland Colony people